This is a list of spaceflights launched between January and June 1960. For launches between July and December, see 1960 in spaceflight (July–December). For an overview of the whole year, see 1960 in spaceflight.

Launches

|colspan=8 style="background:white;"|

January
|-

|colspan=8 style="background:white;"|

February
|-

|colspan=8 style="background:white;"|

March
|-

|colspan=8 style="background:white;"|

April
|-

|colspan=8 style="background:white;"|

May
|-

|colspan=8 style="background:white;"|

June
|-

|}

References

Footnotes

(January-June), 1960 in Spaceflight
Spaceflight by year